Gold Souk Grande is a shopping mall located in Kochi, India Located at Vytilla, the mall has a total floor space of 5,00,000 sq ft spread over five floors. The mall opened in March 2011 with over 200 national and international brands when it was the largest mall in the state of Kerala. The property is owned and managed by Gold Souk group famous for establishing malls in other prominent cities across the country.

References 

Shopping malls in Kochi
2011 establishments in Kerala
Shopping malls established in 2011